= Kleinlein =

Kleinlein is a surname. Notable people with the surname include:

- Axel Kleinlein (born 1969), German mathematician
- Reinhold Kleinlein (1883–1944), German politician
